Taleah Carter López (born 4 February 2000) is an American-born Nicaraguan footballer who plays as a midfielder for collegiate team Cal State Dominguez Hills Toros and the Nicaragua women's national team.

Early life
Carter was born and raised in Brea, California. Her father is African-American and her mother is Nicaraguan.

High school and college career
Carter has attended the Downey High School in Downey, California, the La Habra High School in La Habra, California, the Cypress College in Cypress, California and the California State University, Dominguez Hills in Carson, California.

International career
Carter made her senior debut for Nicaragua on 4 July 2021 as a substitution in a 0–2 friendly away loss to Panama.

References

External links

2000 births
Living people
People with acquired Nicaraguan citizenship
Nicaraguan women's footballers
Women's association football midfielders
Nicaragua women's international footballers
Nicaraguan people of American descent
People from Brea, California
Sportspeople from Orange County, California
Soccer players from California
American women's soccer players
Cypress College alumni
College women's soccer players in the United States
California State University, Dominguez Hills alumni
African-American women's soccer players
American people of Nicaraguan descent
21st-century African-American sportspeople
20th-century African-American sportspeople
20th-century African-American women
20th-century African-American people
21st-century African-American women